John Nunatak is an isolated granite nunatak in Antarctica, lying  north of the Pirrit Hills. The nunatak was examined by United States Antarctic Research Program geologists Edward Thiel and Campbell Craddock on December 13, 1959, in the course of an airlifted geophysical traverse along the 88th meridian West. It was named by the Advisory Committee on Antarctic Names after steelworker Orlan F. John, U.S. Navy, who lost his life in a construction accident at McMurdo Sound, November 2, 1960.

References

Nunataks of Ellsworth Land